Carl Ware (born 1943, Newnan, Georgia) is an American businessman. He is a retired executive vice-president of The Coca-Cola Company.

Biography

Early life
Carl Ware holds a bachelor's degree in political science from Clark College, a master's degree in Public Administration from the Graduate School of Public and International Affairs at the University of Pittsburgh, and is a 1991 graduate of the Harvard Business School's International Senior Management Program.

Career
He was elected to the Atlanta City Council in 1973 and served as president of the Council from 1976 until 1979.

In 1979, he was named Vice President of Special Markets for Coca-Cola USA, with responsibility for expanding African-American and Hispanic marketing and advertising programs. In 1982, Ware was promoted to Vice President of Urban Affairs. In 1986, he was elected Senior Vice President of Coca-Cola. Ware was named Deputy Group President, Northeast Europe and Africa in 1991, and was appointed president of the Africa Group in 1993.

He was elected a director of Chevron Corporation in 2001. He is a former senior adviser to the chief executive officer of The Coca-Cola Co., a position he held from 2003 to 2006. He also sits on the board of directors of the Council on Foreign Relations and Georgia Power.

References

Relevant literature
Ware, Carl with Sibley Fleming. 2019. Portrait of an American Businessman. Macon, GA: Mercer University Press.

American drink industry businesspeople
Directors of Chevron Corporation
Clark Atlanta University alumni
University of Pittsburgh alumni
Harvard Business School alumni
Coca-Cola people
Living people
Atlanta City Council members
1943 births